Larinus araxicola is a species of true weevil found in the Araks valley in northeastern Turkey.

The weevil feeds on Centaurea polypodiifolia L. (Asteraceae). Females lay eggs on the flowerheads, and larvae undergo development inside the flower heads.

References 

Lixinae
Beetles described in 2006
Beetles of Asia